Ashurly is an Azerbaijani surname. Notable people with the surname include:

Israfil Ashurly (born 1969), Azerbaijani mountaineer
Murad Ashurly (1972–2014), Azerbaijani mountaineer, cousin of Israfil

See also
Ashur (disambiguation)

Azerbaijani-language surnames